Cristo Rey College, Tacna, is a private Catholic primary and secondary school, located in the city of Tacna in the south of Peru. The school was founded by the Society of Jesus in 1962.

History
In 1959, from the Chicago Jesuit province, Ernest V. McClear, professor of theology at Saint Mary Seminary of Theology, arrived in Peru to prepare for the arrival of United States Jesuits there. On 17 November 1959, McClear and Fred J. Green arrived. In 1962 these two Jesuits founded Colegio Cristo Rey with two classrooms in the parish of San Pedro. In 1965 it moved to a new location in the area of Para, on land donated by the Gubbins Forero family. In 1969 Green was the director of the high school and Catalina Concannon, of the primary school. Total enrollment was 356 students.

See also

 Colegio de la Inmaculada (Lima)
 List of Jesuit sites

References

Bibliography
 

Jesuit secondary schools in Peru
Jesuit primary schools in Peru
Educational institutions established in 1962
1962 establishments in Peru
Buildings and structures in Tacna Region